Synaptiphilidae is a family of cyclopoid copepods in the order Cyclopoida. There are at least 3 genera and about 10 described species in Synaptiphilidae.

Genera
These three genera belong to the family Synaptiphilidae:
 Enterophilus Kim I.H., 2000
 Presynaptiphilus Bocquet & Stock, 1960
 Synaptiphilus Canu & Cuénot, 1892

References

Cyclopoida
Articles created by Qbugbot
Crustacean families